Perdido is a Spanish and Portuguese word for ‘lost’. It may refer to:

"Perdido" (song), jazz standard composed by Juan Tizol
"Perdido", song from WarCry's album ¿Dónde Está La Luz?
HMS Trouncer (D85), ship also known as USS Perdido
Perdido Beach, Alabama
Perdido Key, Florida
Perdido River, in Alabama and Florida, U.S. 
Perdido Street Station, a novel by China Miéville
Perdido (oil platform), the deepest oil platform in the world
 Monte Perdido (French: Mont Perdu), mountain in the Pyrenees